The Corporation Trust Center is operated by CT Corporation, a subsidiary of Dutch information services firm Wolters Kluwer. The company provides "registered agent services" and, as such, is not responsible for the business or legal affairs of the customers it serves. In 2012, it was the registered agent address of at least 285,000 separate American and foreign businesses who operate or trade in the United States. The one story building is located at 1209 North Orange Street in Wilmington, Delaware, United States.

Many companies are incorporated in Delaware for its business-friendly General Corporation Law. It was estimated in 2012 that $9.5 billion of potential taxes had not been levied over the past decade, due to an arrangement known as the "Delaware loophole". Companies formed in Delaware are required to have an address in the state at which process may be served. Therefore, Delaware entities with no physical office in the state must have a registered agent with a Delaware address. Notable companies represented by CT at this location include Google, American Airlines, Apple Inc., General Motors, The Coca-Cola Company, Walmart, Yum! Brands, Verizon, Take-Two Interactive, NetThunder, multiple subsidiaries of Merlin Entertainments and about 430 of Deutsche Bank's more than 2,000 subsidiary companies and special purpose companies. Both former President of the United States Donald Trump, and his main opponent in the 2016 United States presidential election, Hillary Clinton, have registered companies at the center.

See also
 Delaware General Corporation Law
 List of company registers
 Ugland House in George Town, Cayman Islands

External links
 Video made by Half as Interesting: The Tiny Building Where 285,000 Businesses are Based

References

Buildings and structures in Wilmington, Delaware
Commercial buildings in Delaware
Tax avoidance
Tax avoidance in the United States